Kireet Khurana (born 25 October 1967) is an Indian filmmaker, animator, and ad-film director.  

Kireet joined his father's company to  create Vartmaan.

In 2010, he made his debut with India's first feature film combining live-action and 3D animation, Toonpur Ka Superrhero, starring Ajay Devgan and Kajol. He was invited subsequently to be a partner of the International Animation Consulting Group (IACG), along with Max Howard, Bill Dennis and Frank Lunn.

Kireet's 2016 documentary on Indian parallel cinema auteur Saeed Akhtar Mirza, entitled Saeed Mirza: The Leftist Sufi, released on Netflix. The film featured Mahesh Bhatt, Sudhir Mishra, Kundan Shah, Aziz Mirza, Pawan Malhotra and others. It was named among the top 10 documentaries of 2017 by Vogue India and The Hindu.

His 2018 feature film T for Taj Mahal, produced by Abis Rizvi, was premiered at the London Indian Film Festival. The trailer of the film was launched at the Cannes Film Festival (2018).

Kireet is currently the director Climb Media.His upcoming works include The Storyteller, starring Adil Hussain and Paresh Rawal, and a docu-feature The Invisible Visible, on homelessness and the destitute in India.

Personal
His exposure to animation films started from age six due his father, Bhimsain, who was an Animator. Kireet attended the Jamnabai Narsee School and later completed a BA with a major in economics from the University of Mumbai. Soon thereafter, he graduated from Sheridan College, Canada in animation filmmaking. He teaches animation to children

Filmography

References

1967 births
Living people
Indian animators
Indian filmmakers
Indian film producers
Indian animated film directors
Indian animated film producers
Film directors from Mumbai
Sheridan College animation program alumni
University of Mumbai alumni